Doménica Montero is a Mexican telenovela produced by Valentín Pimstein for Televisa in 1978.

Cast 
Irán Eory - Doménica Montero
Rogelio Guerra - José María Robles Olmos
Raquel Olmedo - Norma Ornales Campo-Miranda
Xavier Marc - Genaro Peña
Beatriz Aguirre 
Rosario Gálvez
Antonio Bravo
Gaston Tuset
Ernesto Yañez
Alejandro Rabago
Blas García
Amalia Llergo

References

External links 
 

Mexican telenovelas
1978 telenovelas
Televisa telenovelas
Spanish-language telenovelas
1978 Mexican television series debuts
1978 Mexican television series endings
Mexican television series based on Venezuelan television series